The 2008 Campeonato Argentino de Rugby  was won by the selection of Buenos Aires that beat in the final the selection of Tucumàn.

"Campeonato"
The eight Team participating were divided in due pools of 4. The first two of each pool admitted to semifinals, the last to play-out for relegation ("Finale descenso")

Pool 1

Pool 2 

(*) The second place was assigned according to the number of tries scored (Rosario 6, Santa Fè 3, Salta 1)

Semifinals

Final 

Tucuman 15.Lucas Barrera Oro, 14.Aníbal Terán, 13.Ezequiel Faralle, 12.Agustín Vallejo, 11.Sebastián Ponce, 10.Diego Mas (60' Nicolás Sánchez), 9.Diego Ternavasio, 8.Agustín Guzmán ( 79' Rafael Garrido), 7.Nicolás Centurión, 6.Ignacio Haustein ( 56' Juan Pablo Lagarrigue), 5.Gabriel Pata Curello (capt), 4.Carlos Casares, 3.Bruno Cuezzo, 2.Ramón Vidal, 1.Felipe Betolli (61' Juan Ávila)
 Buenos Aires: 15. Federico Serra Miras, 14. Agustín Gosio, 13. Juan Ignacio Gauthier, 12. Hernán Senillosa, 11. Pablo Gómez Cora (capt.), 10. Santiago Fernández ( 53` Benjamín Urdapilleta)), 9. Francisco Albarracín, 8. Alejandro Abadie, 7. Facundo López ( 55'Juan Pablo Mirenda), . 6. Alejandro Campos, 5. Felipe Aranguren, 4. James Stuart ( 53`Nahuel Neyra), 3. Francisco Lecot (53' Federico Sánchez), 2. Pablo Gambarini ( 64` Agustín Costa Repetto), 1. Gonzalo Begino

Play out 

Champions:  Buenos Aires
Relegated: 'Mar del Plata'

Torneo "Ascenso"

Pool North 1

Pool North 2

Pool South 1 

{| class="wikitable" 
!rowspan=2 width="7%"| Place
!rowspan=2 width="19%"| Team
!colspan=4 width="30%"| Games
!colspan=3 width="26%"| Points
!rowspan=2 width="8%"|  Bonus 
!rowspan=2 width="10%"| Tablepoints
|-
!width="8%"| played 
!width="8%"| won 
!width="8%"| drawn 
!width="8%"| lost 
!width="10%"| for 
!width="10%"| against 
!width="10%"|diff.
|- align=center style="background: #ccffcc;"
|1 ||align=left|San Juan||3||2 ||1 ||0||94||41||+53||2||12
|- align=center style="background: #ffffff;"
|2 ||align=left|Alto Valle||3||1 ||2 ||0||127||46||+81||1||9|- align=center style="background: #ffffff;"
|3 ||align=left|Sur||3||1 ||1 ||1||71||47||+34||1||7|- align=center style="background: #ffffff;"
|4 ||align=left|Oeste||3||0 ||0 ||3||12||170||-158||0||0|}

 Pool South 2 

 Semifinals 

Final 

 Promoted: Noreste'''

 External links 
  Results da rugbyfun.,com
  Memorias de la UAR 2008
  Francesco Volpe, Paolo Pacitti (Author), Rugby 2009'', GTE Gruppo Editorale (2008)

Campeonato Argentino de Rugby
Argentina